Hotwells Halt railway station, also known as the Hotwells Extension Platform, was a railway station situated in the suburb of Hotwells in Bristol, England. The station opened in 1917, and closed in 1922.

History

The station had a single  timber platform, a run-around loop and a siding, all controlled by a signal box at the northern end of the platform. It was constructed in 1917 by the government-controlled Great Western and Midland railways as a wartime expedient, since workmen's trains were too long for the platform at the  terminus. Some 2,000 dockworkers each day would travel by tram to the terminus, then walk along the riverside to reach Hotwells Halt, where they would buy tickets for Avonmouth. There were two ticket booths, a small one just for Avonmouth tickets, and a larger one for other destinations. The first two services of the day would start at Hotwells Halt, with one return terminating there.

From September 1921, the Halt was the terminus of the BPRP line, as the Hotwells terminus was closed to allow construction of the A4 Portway. Hotwells Halt, and the line to Sneyd Park Junction, closed on 3 July 1922, with the final train running on 1 July.

References

See also
Bristol Port Railway and Pier
Hotwells

Disused railway stations in Bristol
Former Great Western Railway stations
Railway stations in Great Britain opened in 1917
Railway stations in Great Britain closed in 1922
Bristol Port Railway and Pier